The West Elk Loop Scenic and Historic Byway is a  National Forest Scenic Byway and Colorado Scenic and Historic Byway located in Delta, Garfield, Gunnison, Montrose, and Pitkin counties, Colorado, USA. The byway reaches its zenith at Kebler Pass, elevation .

Route

Gallery

See also

History Colorado
List of scenic byways in Colorado
Scenic byways in the United States

Notes

References

External links

America's Scenic Byways: Colorado
Colorado Department of Transportation
Colorado Scenic & Historic Byways Commission
Colorado Scenic & Historic Byways
Colorado Travel Map
Colorado Tourism Office
History Colorado
National Forest Scenic Byways

Colorado Scenic and Historic Byways
National Forest Scenic Byways
National Forest Scenic Byways in Colorado
Gunnison National Forest
White River National Forest
Transportation in Colorado
Transportation in Delta County, Colorado
Transportation in Garfield County, Colorado
Transportation in Gunnison County, Colorado
Transportation in Montrose County, Colorado
Transportation in Pitkin County, Colorado
Tourist attractions in Colorado
Tourist attractions in Delta County, Colorado
Tourist attractions in Garfield County, Colorado
Tourist attractions in Gunnison County, Colorado
Tourist attractions in Montrose County, Colorado
Tourist attractions in Pitkin County, Colorado
U.S. Route 50